Stefan Arndt (born 1961) is a German film producer and managing partner of X-Filme Creative Pool, which he started with fellow friends Tom Tykwer, Wolfgang Becker and Dani Levy. X-Filme is one of Germany's most prosperous and famous production companies. Arndt produces many X Filme productions and acts as head manager of the company. He produced the films Cloud Atlas, Alone in Berlin and Frantz.

Awards
1998 Bavarian Film Awards, Best Production
2013 Bavarian Film Awards, Best Production for Cloud Atlas

References

External links

http://www.x-filme.de (Official Web Page)
http://www.x-filme.de/html/p_arndt.html (Arndt biography (in German))

1961 births
German film producers
Living people
Film people from Munich
Recipients of the Order of Merit of Berlin